Stefan Heythausen (born 27 May 1981) is a German speed skater. He competed in two events at the 2006 Winter Olympics.

References

External links
 

1981 births
Living people
German male speed skaters
Olympic speed skaters of Germany
Speed skaters at the 2006 Winter Olympics
People from Viersen (district)
Sportspeople from Düsseldorf (region)